Phil Graham (1915–1963) was an American publisher and businessman.

Phil or Philip Graham may also refer to:
Philip A. Graham (1910–1993), American politician in the Massachusetts Senate
Philip Graham (writer) (born 1951), American author, professor and editor
Phil Graham (rower) (born 1970), Canadian Olympic rower
Phil Graham (rugby league) (born 1981), Australian rugby league footballer
Philip Graham (rugby league) (born 1960), Australian rugby league player
 Philip Graham, California State Assembly candidate and stepson of former California governor Pete Wilson

See also
Phil Gramm (born 1942), US politician